Clip-on may refer to:

Clip-on tie, a bow tie or necktie that is fixed to the front of the shirt collar by a metal clip
Clip-on lens, a dark sunglasses lens that can be clipped onto corrective eyewear
Clip-on, a type of motorcycle handlebar